OnStage Playhouse is a non-profit community theatre located at 291 3rd Ave. in Chula Vista, California. 

For the past 28 years, OnStage Playhouse has acted as the only community theatre serving the South Bay section of San Diego County, covering the cities of Chula Vista, National City, Imperial Beach and San Ysidro.
 
Each Season, ranging from July to June, the playhouse stages 6 plays or musicals in their 60-seat theatre. All aspects of these productions are done by an all-volunteer cast and crew.

OnStage Playhouse is a member of  American Association of Community Theatre,San Diego Association of Community Theatres, and the San Diego Performing Arts League

External links
OnStage Playhouse website

Theatre in California
Community theatre
Culture of Chula Vista, California